51 Hydrae is a single star in the equatorial constellation of Hydra, located 170 light years away from the Sun. It has the Bayer designation k Hydrae; 51 Hydrae is the Flamsteed designation. This object is visible to the naked eye as a faint, orange-hued star with an apparent visual magnitude of 4.78. It is moving further from the Earth with a heliocentric radial velocity of +20 km/s. Eggen (1971) listed it as a member of the η Cephei group of old-disk stars.

This is an evolved giant star with a stellar classification of K4 III, which indicates it has exhausted the supply of hydrogen at its core and expanded off the main sequence. It has 1.31 times the mass of the Sun but has swollen to 13.5 times the Sun's radius. The star is radiating 55 times the luminosity of the Sun from its enlarged photosphere at an effective temperature of 4,255 K.

References

K-type giants
Hydra (constellation)
Hydrae, k
Durchmusterung objects
Hydrae, 51
125932
070306
5381